Sean O'Sullivan 
 Seán Ó Súilleabháin (1903–1996), folklorist involved in the Irish Folklore Commission
 Seán O'Sullivan (painter) (1906–1964), Irish painter
 Sean O'Sullivan (priest) (1952–1989), Canadian politician and priest
 Shawn O'Sullivan (born 1962), retired Canadian boxer
 Sean O'Sullivan (baseball) (born 1987), Major League Baseball pitcher
 Sean O'Sullivan (rugby league) (born 1998), Australian rugby league player
 Seán O'Sullivan (footballer) (fl. 2000s), Irish Gaelic footballer who plays for Kerry and Cromane
 Sean O'Sullivan (engineer), entrepreneur and engineer
 Sean O'Sullivan (snooker player)
 Sean O'Sullivan (chess grandmaster)

See also
Sean Sullivan (disambiguation)